Ouo Sarre is a village and seat of the rural commune of Bara Sara in the Cercle of Bandiagara in the Mopti Region of southern-central Mali.

References

Populated places in Mopti Region